Thomas Baldry (by 1481 – 1524/25), of Ipswich, Suffolk, was an English politician.

He was the son of Thomas Baldry (d.1500) of Ipswich and brother of Thomas Baldry, Mayor of London for 1523.

He was a Member of Parliament (MP) for Ipswich in 1504, 1512 and 1515.

References

15th-century births
1525 deaths

Year of birth unknown
Members of the Parliament of England (pre-1707) for Ipswich
English MPs 1504
English MPs 1512–1514
English MPs 1515